Million's Poet is a reality television show in the United Arab Emirates, which was first broadcast in December 2006.  The show is a Nabati vernacular poetry competition in which the participants compose and recite poems.  

The show is funded by the Abu Dhabi Authority for Culture & Heritage and is inspired by a pre-Islamic poetry festival at Souk Okaz. 48 participants are selected from among several thousand applicants. In each episode, participants read a poem they have written. A panel of judges evaluate the style and language of the poems and the quality of the recitation; contestants also receive votes from the audience, and are eliminated from the competition until five finalists remain. These receive cash prizes that have varied from 1 to 5 million UAE dirham.

In 2010, journalist and editor Hissa Hilal was the show's first female finalist, finishing third in the finals. Her poems strongly criticized "ad hoc fatwas", religious extremism and conservative clerics.

See also
Prince of Poets

References

External links
Ahlanlive.com

Emirati reality television series
Arabic-language television shows
Arabic poetry awards
2000s Emirati television series
2010s Emirati television series
2006 Emirati television series debuts
Talent shows
Abu Dhabi TV original programming